Sanphet (Sarvajña ; "Omniscient", referring to the Buddha) was a Thai royal title. It may refer to:

 Kings of Ayutthaya:
 Mahathammarachathirat (king of Ayutthaya) or Sanphet I (1509–1590)
 Naresuan or Sanphet II (1555–1605)
 Ekathotsarot or Sanphet III (died 1610)
 Si Saowaphak or Sanphet IV (died 1620)
 Prasat Thong or Sanphet V (died 1656)
 Chai (king of Ayutthaya) or Sanphet VI (died 1656)
 Si Suthammaracha or Sanphet VII (died 1656)
 Suriyenthrathibodi or Sanphet VIII (died 1709)
 Thai Sa or Sanphet IX (died 1733)
 Places in the Ayutthaya Historical Park
 Wat Phra Si Sanphet, an ancient Buddhist temple
 Phra Si Sanphet, a renowned Buddhist image
 Sanphet Prasat, a royal hall

Thai royal titles